Demon Apocalypse is the sixth book in Darren Shan's The Demonata series. Darren Shan released the title of the book September 29, 2007 at the Baeth Festival of Children's Literature.

Darren Shan wished that nothing about this book, not even the title, be known to the public until late September, close to the book's release. This is the first time this has happened with any of the Darren Shan books, possibly initiated by the recent popularity increase in the author's works.

It is published in the United Kingdom and the United States.

Plot

Picking up where Blood Beast left off, Grubbs is on a plane in a dire situation face-to-face with Lord Loss and Juni Swan who has just been revealed to be one of his higher ranked familiars. Just when it seems like Grubbs will be killed, Beranabus (the homeless man from the previous book that had been following him around Carcery Vale, and a powerful magician who the Disciples follow) appears, the two jump from the plane, and fly to his cave. Once there, Beranabus and Kernel take Grubbs with them to fight a demon in one of the Demonata worlds. Grubbs chickens out and is stuck in Beranabus' home for seven weeks. Once Beranabus and Kernel return from demon hunting, they all discover that the tunnel that Bec had sealed 1600 years ago has been opened, and hell has been brought to Earth. Enlisting the help of the Disciples, Grubbs, Kernel, and Beranabus set out to reseal the tunnel and remove the Demonata from Earth at the same time.

After arriving at the tunnel, Kernel gets his eyes gouged out by Spine (one of Lord Loss's familiars) and Grubbs sees all his friends' and Dervish's heads carried by demons (Not Bill-E's). The spirit of Bec appears again and tells Beranabus that sealing the tunnel will not remove the demons like it did last time. In the chaos, the Kah-Gash (the weapon powerful enough to destroy universes) awakes in Grubbs, Kernel and Bec and turn back time to a point just before the tunnel was opened, providing Grubbs, Kernel, and Beranabus a way to prevent mankind's extinction. During the cave battle between Beranabus' group and Lord Loss', it is revealed that Bill-E must be killed to prevent the opening of the tunnel, since he unwittingly sacrificed Loch to open the tunnel. Because Dervish is unable to kill his nephew, Grubbs is forced to painlessly kill Bill-E. This seals the tunnel, and also forces the retreat of a shadowy creature unlike any demon Grubbs has seen before. Bec, her essence trapped within Grubbs, fills Bill-E's body and mutates it to resemble hers. It is revealed that Bec's spirit has been trapped inside the cave for the past 1600 years, believed by Beranabus to be because she is part of the Kah-Gash, along with Grubbs and Kernel. Now knowing what is at stake, Grubbs leaves Dervish in the care of Bec and joins Beranabus and Kernel on their never ending quest to prevent more tunnels from opening and to learn more about the creature known as the Shadow.

References

External links

 Official Darren Shan Site
 Official Darren Shan Blog
 Demonata website

2007 Irish novels
The Demonata novels
Demon novels
HarperCollins books